Kawagama Lake is located on the northwestern border of Haliburton and Muskoka counties in Central Ontario, Canada.

Description
Kawagama lake is the largest lake in Haliburton county, it does not have any towns or settlements on it. It has two marinas ( Mountain Trout House and Old Mill Marina) and two access points. The word "kawagama" is Native for "hollow". At the northeast end of Kawagama Lake it connects to Bear Lake.

The main area of the lake has eight inhabited islands, one housing a camp called Moorelands camp for underprivileged children from the Greater Toronto Area.

The Ministry of Natural Resources controls the lake level.

Fourteen creeks and small rivers feed Kawagama Lake, the two main ones are the short Bear River and the Hollow River. The Hollow River flows into the Lake of Bays.

Wild life
Kawagama lake is home to water birds such as loons and ducks, mammals such as black bears, moose, deer, foxes and raccoons and fish such as lake trout and bass.

Location
The communities of Dorset, Dwight and Baysville are the closest settlements, while the largest major settlement is Huntsville.

See also
List of lakes in Ontario

References

Other map sources:

Lakes of Haliburton County
Lakes of the District Municipality of Muskoka